Qian Haitao is a Chinese Greco-Roman wrestler. He won one of the bronze medals at the 82kg event at the 2019 World Wrestling Championships held in Nur-Sultan, Kazakhstan.

In 2019, he won one of the bronze medals in the 82kg event at the Asian Wrestling Championships held in Xi'an, China.

He competed in the 87kg event at the 2022 World Wrestling Championships held in Belgrade, Serbia.

Achievements

References

External links 
 

Living people
Year of birth missing (living people)
Place of birth missing (living people)
Chinese male sport wrestlers
World Wrestling Championships medalists
Asian Wrestling Championships medalists
21st-century Chinese people